Ania Szarmach (born 12 February 1978, Starogard Gdański, Poland) – also known as Sharmi – is a Polish jazz and pop singer, composer and songwriter. She is a graduate of University of Music in Katowice. In 2011 she was nominated to Fryderyk music award.

Discography

Studio albums

Music videos

References

External links

1978 births
Living people
Polish jazz singers
Polish pop singers
Polish soul singers
Polish lyricists
21st-century Polish singers
21st-century Polish women singers